Ghetto Blaster is a computer game, released for the Commodore 64 in 1985. It was developed by two former employees, Tony Gibson and Mark Harrison of Taskset, a software house.

Gameplay and Story
Rockin' Rodney, the player character and protagonist of the game has been employed as a courier for the fictional record company Interdisc. The player must find and collect batteries for his ghetto blaster and then locate ten cassette tape demos of dance music and get people to dance to them with his boombox. He must deliver the tapes to Interdisc through a maze of streets, alleyways, and cul-de-sacs, which are laid out and populated by various characters.

The street names are named after famous songs ("Blackberry Way", "Desolation Row", etc.), A map is provided in the cassette inlay, and some of the characters reference others.

Reception
Zzap!64 was impressed by the music and found the gameplay appealing, but felt that the repetitive nature and lack of a real scoring system diminished any chance of developing a lasting interest.

References

1985 video games
Action video games
Commodore 64 games
Commodore 64-only games
Dance video games
Video games developed in the United Kingdom
Video games featuring black protagonists